As the Axis powers of Germany, Italy, and Japan cemented their military alliance by mutually declaring war against the United States on December 11, 1941, the Japanese proposed a clear territorial arrangement with the two main European Axis powers concerning the Asian continent. On December 15, they presented the Germans with a drafted military convention that would delimit the continent of Asia into two separate "operational spheres" (zones of military responsibility) by a dividing line along the 70th meridian east longitude, going southwards through the Ob River's Arctic estuary, southwards to just east of Khost in Afghanistan and heading into the Indian Ocean just west of Rajkot in India, to split the Lebensraum land holdings of Germany and the similar spazio vitale areas of Italy to the west of it, and the Empire of Japan (and the Greater East Asia Co-Prosperity Sphere) to the east of it, after a complete defeat of the Soviet Union by the Third Reich.

The Germans initially disliked this proposal, as its diplomats feared that it was a front for establishing a precedent for the specific delimitation of political spheres. The German army was also disappointed that it failed to contain any promises for Japan entering the war against the Soviet Union, or even to halt shipments of American supplies through the Pacific Soviet port of Vladivostok.

The arbitrary border was further criticized by the Wehrmacht's office of military economy (Wi Rü Amt) because it cut through territories and states that comprised organic economic units whose parts were mutually dependent on each other. It instead proposed a division that would follow existing international boundaries, along the eastern border of Iran, the northern border of Afghanistan, the western border of China up to Tannu Tuva, and then northwards along the Yenisei river to the Arctic Ocean. Despite assigning all of British India and Afghanistan to Japan, this would give Germany a better and more easily defensible frontier in Siberia, and also grant it control over the Kuznetsk industrial basin in addition to the rich iron ore deposits of the eastern Ural mountains. The plan of the Third Reich for fortifying its own Lebensraum territory's eastern limits, beyond which the Co-Prosperity Sphere's northwestern frontier areas would exist in Northeast Asia, involved the creation of a "living wall" of Wehrbauer "soldier-peasant" communities defending it. However, it is unknown if the Axis powers ever formally negotiated a possible, complementary second demarcation line that would have divided the Western Hemisphere.

Adolf Hitler found the Japanese proposal acceptable and approved it in full, possibly because he did not envisage Germany seizing much of any Soviet territory beyond the Ural Mountains.

See also
 A-A line
 German-Japanese relations
 Operation Orient
 Greater East Asia Co-Prosperity Sphere
 Hakkō ichiu
 Hokushin-ron
 Jewish settlement in the Japanese Empire
 Monsun Gruppe - German-Japanese naval cooperation in the Indian Ocean theatre
 Nanshin-ron
 New Order (Nazism)
 Ural Mountains in Nazi planning
 Wehrbauer
 Italian imperialism under Fascism

References

Soviet Union in World War II
Foreign relations of Nazi Germany
Germany–Japan military relations
Politics of World War II
Orders by Adolf Hitler
Foreign relations of the Empire of Japan
Axis powers
Geopolitics